Halgerda johnsonorum is a species of sea slug, a dorid nudibranch, a shell-less marine gastropod mollusk in the family Discodorididae.

Distribution 
This species is found in the tropical western Pacific, at the Marshall Islands.

References

Discodorididae
Gastropods described in 2000